The 2014 Sun Belt Conference football season was the 14th college football season for the Sun Belt Conference. During the 2014 season, eleven schools competed in Sun Belt football: Appalachian State, Arkansas State, Georgia Southern, Georgia State, Idaho, Louisiana–Lafayette, Louisiana–Monroe, New Mexico State, South Alabama, Texas State, and Troy.

The conference title was won by Georgia Southern, in its first year as both a Sun Belt member and an FBS program. The Eagles became only the third team to win a conference championship in their first FBS season. The other two schools to accomplish this feat were Nevada, Big West Conference champions in 1992, and Marshall, which won the Mid-American Conference crown in 1997. Georgia Southern also became the first team ever to go unbeaten in conference play in its first FBS season (both the 1992 Nevada and 1997 Marshall teams lost once in conference play).

Previous season
The Louisiana-Lafayette Ragin' Cajuns and the Arkansas State Red Wolves both finished 5-2 and were co-champions of the Sun Belt Conference. The Ragin' Cajuns earned the conference's first bowl spot in the R+L Carrier New Orleans Bowl, as Louisiana-Lafayette defeated Tulane 24–21 to win their 3rd straight New Orleans Bowl. Arkansas State earned the second and final Sun Belt bowl, as they played in the GoDaddy Bowl. Arkansas State scored a late touchdown in the fourth quarter to upset Ball State, who entered the game with a 10–2 record, and win their second straight GoDaddy Bowl.

The Sun Belt had seven teams eligible for bowl games, but only two received bids (Louisiana-Lafayette and ASU). Western Kentucky had the third best record at 8–4, while ULM, South Alabama, Texas State, and Troy had records of 6-6. The only team that was not eligible for a bowl game was Georgia State.

Preseason

Award watch lists
The following Sun Belt players were named to preseason award watch lists:

Walter Camp Award:
 Qushaun Lee – Arkansas State

Butkus Award:
 Michael Orakpo - Texas State

Davey O'Brien Award:
 Terrance Broadway – Louisiana–Lafayette

Mackey Award:
 Darion Griswold - Arkansas State
 Wes Saxton - South Alabama

Ray Guy Award:
 Justin Manton - UL Monroe
 Austin Rehkow - Idaho

Lou Groza Award:
 Maxwell Johnson - New Mexico State

Rimington Trophy:
 Bryce Giddens - Arkansas State
 Valerian Ume-Ezeoke - New Mexico State
 Mike Marboe - Idaho

Thorpe Award:
 Sterling Young – Arkansas State
 Rocky Hayes – Arkansas State

Paul Hornung Award:
 Rashon Ceaser - UL Monroe
 J. D. McKissic - Arkansas State

Lombardi Award:
 Bryce Giddens - Arkansas State
 Qushaun Lee - Arkansas State
 Justin Hamilton - Louisiana-Lafayette
 Mykhael Quave - Louisiana-Lafayette
 Daniel Quave - Louisiana-Lafayette
 Dominique Tovell - Louisiana-Lafayette
 Gerrand Johnson - UL Monroe
 David Mayo - Texas State
 Terrence Jones - Troy
 Tyler Roberts - Troy
 Ucambre Williams - South Alabama

Doak Walker Award:
 Marcus Cox - Appalachian State
 Michael Gordon – Arkansas State
 Alonzo Harris – Louisiana-Lafayette
 Robert Lowe – Texas State

Sun Belt Media Day
Sun Belt Conference Media Day was held on July 22, 2014 in the Mercedes-Benz Superdome in New Orleans, Louisiana.

Preseason Offensive Player of the Year - Terrance Broadway (QB, Louisiana-Lafayette)
Preseason Defensive Player of the Year - Qushaun Lee (DL, Arkansas State)

Coaches Poll
 Louisiana-Lafayette - 121 (11)
 Arkansas State - 102
 South Alabama - 98
 Troy - 84
 UL Monroe - 78
 Texas State - 70
 Appalachian State - 47
 Georgia Southern - 44
 Idaho - 29
 Georgia State - 27
 New Mexico State - 26

Preseason All–Conference Team

Offense
QB Terrance Broadway (Louisiana-Lafayette)
RB Alonzo Harris (Louisiana-Lafayette)
RB Elijah McGuire (Louisiana-Lafayette)
WR J.D. McKissic (Arkansas State)
WR Jamal Robinson (Louisiana-Lafayette)
WR Rashon Ceaser (UL Monroe)
TE Wes Saxton (South Alabama)
OL Daniel Quave (Louisiana-Lafayette)
OL Mike Marboe, (Idaho)
OL Chris May (South Alabama)
OL Ucambre Williams (South Alabama)
OL Terrence Jones (Troy)

Defense
DL Chris Stone (Arkansas State)
DL Justin Hamilton (Louisiana-Lafayette)
DL Gerrand Johnson (UL Monroe)
DL Tyler Roberts (Troy)
LB Qushaun Lee (Arkansas State)
LB Dominique Tovell (Louisiana-Lafayette)
LB David Mayo (Texas State)
LB Michael Orakpo (Texas State)
DB Rocky Hayes (Arkansas State)
DB Sterling Young (Arkansas State)
DB Trevence Patt (Louisiana-Lafayette)
DB Craig Mager (Texas State)

Specialists
PK Jason Dann (Texas State)
P Austin Rehkow (Idaho)
RS J.D. McKissic (Arkansas State)

Coaches
Note: Stats shown are before the beginning of the season

Sun Belt vs. CFP AQ Conference matchups

Regular season

All dates, times, and TV are tentative and subject to change.

Start times for non-conference games are local for the Sun Belt team; for conference games, starting times are local for the home team. The following list are the teams in their respective time zones: Arkansas State, Louisiana–Monroe, Louisiana–Lafayette, South Alabama, Texas State and Troy are located in the Central Time Zone; Appalachian State, Georgia State, Georgia Southern is in the Eastern Time Zone; New Mexico State is in the Mountain Time Zone and Idaho is in the Pacific Time Zone.

Rankings reflect that of the USA Today Coaches poll for that week until week eight when the BCS poll will be used.

Week 1

Open Week: South Alabama

Players of the week:

Week 2

Open Week: Texas State

Players of the week:

Week 3

Open Week: Appalachian State

Players of the week:

Week 4

Open Week: Louisiana-Monroe

Players of the week:

Week 5

Open Week: Arkansas State, Georgia State, Louisiana-Lafayette

Players of the week:

Week 6

Open Week: Troy

Players of the week:

Week 7

Open Week: Louisiana-Lafayette, South Alabama, Texas State

Players of the week:

Week 8

Open Week: Arkansas State, Georgia Southern, Louisiana-Monroe

Players of the week:

Week 9

Open Week: Appalachian State, Idaho, New Mexico State

Players of the week:

Week 10

Players of the week:

Week 11

Players of the week:

Week 12

Open Week: Georgia State, New Mexico State

Players of the week:

Week 13

Open Week: Georgia Southern, Idaho, Troy

Players of the week:

Week 14

Players of the week:

Bowl games
In 2014, the SBC placed three teams in bowl games through their tie-ins: Louisiana–Lafayette, Arkansas State, and South Alabama. Texas State was also bowl-eligible but did not receive a bowl invitation. Georgia Southern and Appalachian State, despite having bowl-eligible records (9-3 and 7–5, respectively) and the former winning the conference championship, were not bowl-eligible due to FCS-to-FBS transition rules, since 81 full FBS members became bowl-eligible for the 76 bowl slots available.

Note: All times are local

Players of the Year
2014 Sun Belt Player of the Year awards

All-Conference Players
Coaches All-Conference Selections

Honorable Mention: Appalachian State: Drew Bailey, Parker Collins, Kennan Gilchrist, Joel Ross; Arkansas State: Tres Houston, Chris Stone, Andrew Tyron, Xavier Woodson; Georgia Southern: Logan Daves, Deion Stanley, Jay Ellison, Antwione Williams; Georgia State: Nick Arbuckle, Tim Wynn, LynQuez Blair, Robert Davis; Idaho: Marc Millan, Quinton Bradley, Matt Linehan, Elijhaa Penny; Louisiana-Lafayette: Tominique Tovell, Larry Pettis, Terrance Broadway, Terry Johnson; Louisiana-Monroe: Trey Caldwell, Kenzee Jackson, Michael Johnson, Ray Stovall; New Mexico State: Rodney Butler, Winston Rose, Larry Rose III, Derek Ibekwe; South Alabama Chris May, Melvin Meggs, Jesse Kelley, Montell Garner; Texas State: Will Johnson, Tyler Jones, Robert Lowe, Ryan Melton; Troy: Dalton Bennett, Brandon Burks, Tyler Roberts, Bryan Holmes.

Home attendance

References